Tooro is a Bantu kingdom located within the borders of Uganda. The current Omukama of Toro is King Oyo Nyimba Kabamba Iguru Rukidi IV. King Oyo Nyimba Kabamba Iguru Rukidi IV took to the throne of Tooro kingdom in 1995 at the age of just three years, after the death of his father Omukama Patrick David Matthew Kaboyo Rwamuhokya Olimi III on August 26, 1995, at the age of 50.

The people native to the kingdom are the Batooro, and their language is likewise called Rutooro, Bakonzo, Babwisi/Bamba. The Batoro and Banyoro speak closely related languages, Rutoro and Runyoro, and share many other similar cultural traits. The Batoro live on Uganda's western border, south of Lake Albert.

History  
The Tooro Kingdom evolved out of a breakaway segment of Bunyoro sometime before the nineteenth century. It was founded in 1830 when Omukama Kaboyo Olimi I, the eldest son of Omukama of Bunyoro Nyamutukura Kyebambe III of Bunyoro, seceded and established his own independent kingdom. Absorbed into Bunyoro-Kitara in 1876, it reasserted its independence in 1891.

As with Buganda, Bunyoro, and Busoga, Tooro's monarchy was abolished in 1967 by the Government of Uganda, but was reinstated in 1993.

Cultural influence 
The Austrian painter Friedensreich Hundertwasser (1928–2000) spent some time there in the 1960s where he painted a number of works and named them after the kingdom. The Batooro people have a strong culture but similar in stratification to Banyoro. They have got a strong cultural naming system (PET NAME) known as Empaako. With the Empaako naming system, children are given one of twelve names shared across the communities in addition to their given and family names. Addressing someone by his or her Empaako is a positive affirmation of cultural ties. It can be used as a form of greeting or a declaration of affection, respect, honour or love. Use of Empaako can defuse tension or anger and sends a strong message about social identity and unity, peace and reconciliation. The Empaako names are: AMOOTI, ABOOKI, AKIIKI, ATEENYI, ADYEERI, ATWOOKI, ABWOOLI, ARAALI, ACAALI, BBALA and OKAALI.

Abakama of Tooro  
The following is a list of the Abakama of Tooro since 1800:

 Olimi I: 1822–1865
 Ruhaga of Toro: 1865–1866
 Nyaika Kyebambe I: 1866–1871 and 1871–1872
 Rukidi I: 1871
 Olimi II: 1872–1875
 Rukidi II: 1875–1875
 Rububi Kyebambe II: 1875 and 1877–1879
 Kakende Nyamuyonjo: 1875–1876 and 1879–1880
 Katera: 1876–1877 
Interregnum, reverted to Bunyoro: 1880–1891
 Kyebambe III: 1891–1928
 Rukidi III: 1929–1965
 Olimi III: 1965–1967 and 1993-1995
in pretence: 1967–1993 (monarchy abolished)
 Rukidi IV: 1995 (monarchy reinstated)

See also
 Omukama of Tooro
 Omukama of Bunyoro
 Bunyoro Kingdom
 Kingdom of Buganda
 Elizabeth of Toro

Bibliography
 Ingham, Kenneth. The Kingdom of Tooro in Uganda. London: Methuen, 1975.

References

External links
Tooro Kingdom

 
Ugandan monarchies
States and territories established in 1830
1830 establishments in Africa